= Șaru Dornei mine =

Manganese mine in Romania

- Location: Suceava County, Romania
- Products: Manganese

The Șaru Dornei mine is a mine located in the north of Romania in Suceava County. Șaru Dornei represents one of the largest manganese reserve in the Romania having estimated reserves of 15 million tonnes of manganese ore grading 26% manganese metal.
